The 2nd Helpmann Awards ceremony was presented by the Australian Entertainment Industry Association (AEIA), currently known by its trade name, Live Performance Australia (LPA), for achievements in disciplines of Australia's live performance sectors. The ceremony took place on 6 May 2002 at the Star City Show Room in Sydney and was hosted by Simon Burke for the second year in a row. During the ceremony, the AEIA handed out awards in twelve categories for achievements in theatre, musicals, opera, ballet, dance and concerts.

The ceremony received criticism for its rules and voting procedures, and was compared to the previous ceremony's "polished awards night".

Winners and nominees
In the following tables, winners are listed first and highlighted in boldface.

Theatre

Musicals

Opera

Dance and Physical Theatre

Other

Industry

Lifetime Achievement

References

External links

Helpmann Awards
Helpmann Awards
Helpmann Awards
Helpmann Awards, 2nd
Helpmann Awards